883 may refer to:

883 the Common Era year
883 (number), the number
883 (band), an Italian pop rock band
+883, a country calling code
883 Matterania, an asteroid